Brannenburg is a municipality in the district of  Rosenheim in Bavaria in Germany. There is a train station is located in Brannenburg.

References

Rosenheim (district)